Platydoris sanguinea is a species of sea slug, a dorid nudibranch, shell-less marine opisthobranch gastropod mollusks in the family Discodorididae.

Distribution
This species was described from the south island of the Saleyer Islands, Sulawesi, Indonesia. It is known only from the Philippines and Indonesia.

References

External links
 
 

Discodorididae
Gastropods described in 1905